Anthony Wayne Cook Mansion is a historic home located at Cooksburg in Barnett Township, Forest County, Pennsylvania, United States. It was built in 1880, and is a three-story, irregularly shaped Queen Anne style dwelling.  It features a two-story tower, multiple dormers, a front gable, and one-story porch.  Also on the property is a contributing carriage house, ice house, and chicken coops.

It was added to the National Register of Historic Places in 1979.

References

Houses completed in 1880
Houses in Forest County, Pennsylvania
Houses on the National Register of Historic Places in Pennsylvania
Queen Anne architecture in Pennsylvania
National Register of Historic Places in Forest County, Pennsylvania